Cécil Karl-August Timon Ernst Anton von Renthe-Fink (1885–1964) was a German diplomat. He was Plenipotentiary of Denmark from 9 April 1940 until 1942.

In 1926, Cécil von Renthe-Fink was posted to Dresden as Joint Secretary of the International Elbe Commission. This Commission had been set up by the League of Nations to ensure that the Elbe was kept as a free outlet to the North Sea for shipping from Czechoslovakia.

He was appointed envoy to Denmark in 1936. In 1939 he became a member of the Nazi party. After the occupation of Denmark he became Plenipotentiary (Reichsbevollmächtigter). In 1942, he was replaced by Dr. Werner Best after the Telegram Crisis. Berlin was hoping for a harder line.

In 1943, Renthe-Fink was posted to Vichy France. In that year, the German ministers Joachim von Ribbentrop and Renthe-Fink proposed the creation of a European Confederation, which would have had a single currency, a central bank in Berlin, a regional principle, a labour policy, and economic and trading agreements.

He was married to Countess Christa von Eckstädt, daughter of Count Vitzthum von Eckstädt.

Notes

References

1885 births
1964 deaths
Ambassadors of Germany to Denmark
Nazi Party members